Raunchy or raunch may refer to:

Raunchy (instrumental), a 1957 song
Raunchy (band), a metal band
Hardcore pornography
Raunch aesthetics, the ways in which women in hip hop express their sexuality
Raunch culture, concept described by Ariel Levy in the book Female Chauvinist Pigs

See also
Ranchy, a commune in France